Paralamyctes ginini is a species of centipede in the Henicopidae family. It is endemic to Australia. It was first described in 2004 by palaeontologist Gregory Edgecombe.

Distribution
The species occurs in south-eastern New South Wales.  The type locality is South Ramshead, Kosciuszko National Park, in the Snowy Mountains.

Behaviour
The centipedes are solitary terrestrial predators that inhabit plant litter and soil.

References

 

 
ginini
Centipedes of Australia
Endemic fauna of Australia
Fauna of the Australian Capital Territory
Fauna of New South Wales
Animals described in 2004
Taxa named by Gregory Edgecombe